Lin Chih-chia (born 31 March 1958) is a Taiwanese politician. He is currently the Secretary-General of Legislative Yuan, having served since 1 February 2016.

References

Living people
1958 births
Kuomintang Members of the Legislative Yuan in Taiwan
Taiwan Solidarity Union chairpersons
Taiwan Solidarity Union Members of the Legislative Yuan
Members of the 1st Legislative Yuan in Taiwan
Members of the 2nd Legislative Yuan
Members of the 3rd Legislative Yuan
Members of the 4th Legislative Yuan
Members of the 6th Legislative Yuan
Party List Members of the Legislative Yuan
New Taipei Members of the Legislative Yuan
Fu Jen Catholic University alumni